Live at Brixton '87 is the fifth live album by the band Motörhead, recorded on 23 December 1987, at the Brixton Academy in London, but wasn't released until 12 April 1994.

It was released by Roadrunner Records under licence, but without the permission of the band, and as such has a controversial entry into the band's catalogue. Lemmy didn't collaborate with the album until 2005 on its Sanctuary reissue.

Recording 
The band originally meant to use this concert for what became 1988's Nö Sleep at All live album, but because this material 'went missing' for some years, they couldn't, and the Finnish concert of some 6 months later at the Giants of Rock Festival was used instead. This concert was available as a bootleg for many years, before finally seeing a licensed release under the Dutch label Roadrunner in 1994, but the sound quality is still very poor for a 'produced' live album. It was not mastered very well from the original tapes, and the reissued Sanctuary release of 2005 does not appear to have had a remaster either. The concert itself is more of a testament to 1986s Orgasmatron and 1987s Rock 'N' Roll album, as most of these songs never got played again live after this tour ended in 1988, until 2004 for one or two.

Release 
Originally released in 1994 as Live at Brixton but renamed Live at Brixton '87 in 2005 when reissued  by Sanctuary. Some of the tracks are staples but the majority are tracks not played by the band since this tour.

"Doctor Rock", from the previous studio album Orgasmatron, and "Just 'Cos You Got the Power" from the Eat the Rich single, wouldn't be heard from again until the 2004 DVD, Stage Fright.

"Stay Clean", "Metropolis" and "Ace of Spades" have only been missing on two official live albums, Live in Toronto in 1982 with Eddie Clarke and the widely bootlegged Live in Manchester in 1983 with Brian Robertson on guitar, released officially in 2005 as a bonus disk on Another Perfect Day remaster, so their inclusion is not surprising.

"Deaf Forever" and "Built for Speed" from Orgasmatron; "Eat the Rich", "Stone Deaf in the U.S.A.", "Traitor" and "Dogs" from Rock 'N' Roll; all only saw live performances during the 1986-88 tour/s as by the nineties had been dropped completely from the live set, even for random gigs.

This is the only official live recording of the song "Rock 'N' Roll" to be released by the band.

Notably missing from this set are "No Class", "Orgasmatron", "Motörhead", "Killed by Death" and "Overkill", all of which were played at the concert but missing from this release and its predecessor, though there is a Japanese bootleg with the complete concert in circulation. Lemmy eventually collaborated with Sanctuary to 'officially' release the album.

Reception 
AllMusics Eduardo Rivadavia has stated:

Track listing

Personnel 
 Lemmy Kilmister – lead vocals, bass
 Phil Campbell – lead guitar, backing vocals
 Würzel - lead guitar, backing vocals
 Phil Taylor – drums

Production 
 Producer - Mo The Man
 Recorded - Live at the Brixton Academy, Brixton, London 23 December 1987
 Album Design - Hiro Takahashi (cover), Hugh Gilmour (design), Dave Ling (liner notes), Mick Stvenson (photography)

References 

Motörhead live albums
1994 live albums
Heavy metal compilation albums